Cedar Bluff Overlook Park is a recreational park located on a high bluff in the town of Cedar Bluff, Virginia in Tazewell County, Virginia, United States.  The park grounds feature a stepped trail with dramatic views of the town and the Clinch River which winds through the small town of Cedar Bluff, the birthplace of former Virginia Governor George C. Peery.  The park contains three picnic shelters, horseshoe pits, badminton court, restrooms and a playground, as well as parking space for guests.

An American Civil War interpretive marker is located at the park.

References

Further reading
"Cedar Bluff, Historic Mill Town on the Clinch" by Louise B Leslie & Dr. Terry W. Mullins; Chapter 5, Pages 87, 88, 89, 90 with pictures; published by the Tazewell County Historical Society www.tazewellcounty.org; printed by Vance Graphics www.vancegraphics.com.
Published Minutes of Tazewell County Board of Supervisors April 6, 2010: "Cedar Bluff cuts USRT460 Bridges awarded to DLB, Inc., Hills ville 
2035 Reg. Cumberland Plateau Planning District Commission 2011; Section 6 "Bicycle and Pedestrian Facilities" with pictures.

External links 
 www.visittazewellcounty.org

Protected areas of Tazewell County, Virginia